Unearthed is a double album by Nic Jones, released in 2001. The album is a collection of remastered live material recorded before 1982.

Track listing

"The Jukebox As She Turned" (Jeff Deitchman) 2:39
"Bonny George Campbell" (Trad. Arr. Nic Jones) 2:29
"Roxburgh Castle" (Trad. Arr. Nic Jones) 1:07
"Boots of Spanish Leather" (Bob Dylan) 4:26
"Warlike Lads Of Russia" (Trad. Arr. Nic Jones) 3:28
"Prickly Bush" (Trad. Arr. Nic Jones) 3:43
"Captain Glen" (Trad. Arr. Nic Jones) 4:17
"Billy Don't You Weep For Me" (Trad. Arr. Nic Jones) 4:54
"Fare Thee Well My Dearest Dear" (Trad. Arr. Nic Jones) 5:04
"Plains Of Boyle" (Trad. Arr. Nic Jones) 3:13
"Icarus" (Anne Lister) 4:22
"Rufford Park Poachers" (Trad. Arr. Nic Jones) 6:45
"Oh Dear, Rue The Day" (Trad. Arr. Nic Jones) 3:33
"Love Will You Marry Me" (Trad. Arr. Nic Jones) 1:35
"On A Monday Morning" (Cyril Tawney) 3:33
"Yarmouth Town" (Trad. Arr. Nic Jones) 2:35
"Master Kilby" (Trad. Arr. Nic Jones) 3:18
"Jimmy Allen" (Trad. Arr. Nic Jones) 1:16
"William Of Winesbury" (Trad. Arr. Nic Jones) 4:08
"Nine Times A Night" (Trad. Arr. Nic Jones) 1:25
"Annachie Gordon" (Trad. Arr. Nic Jones) 6:51
"Taoist Tale" (Tucker Zimmerman) 6:26
"Rapunzel" (Trad. Arr. Nic Jones) 3:18
"Clyde Water" (Trad. Arr. Nic Jones) 7:11
"Hamburger Polka" (Trad. Arr. Nic Jones) 1:23
"Barbara Ellen" (Trad. Arr. Nic Jones) 6:45
"Wanton Seed" (Trad. Arr. Nic Jones) 2:06
"Sonny Brogan's Mazurka" (Trad. Arr. Nic Jones) 1:38
"Dives And Lazarus" (Trad. Arr. Nic Jones) 5:50
"I'm Going In A Field" (Ivor Cutler) 2:54
"Ten Thousand Miles" (Trad. Arr. Nic Jones) 4:54

References

Nic Jones albums
2001 live albums